James George Haskins (born 1914, died 1990) was a politician and businessman from Botswana.

Haskins was born in Bulawayo. His father was James Haskins from Bristol who run coffee business in Tati Concessions Land and later a trading store chain headquartered in Francistown. Haskins founded the Francistown Chamber of Commerce.

Haskins entered politics in 1948 as a member of European Advisory Council. He was a member of the Legislative Council of Bechuanaland 1961–1964. He was a member of Bechuanaland Democratic Party.

Haskins could be considered a spokesperson of the white community in Botswana and an advocate for Botswana independence. In 1966, he became a member of National Assembly of Botswana. The same year he joined cabinet and held offices of minister of commerce, industry and water affairs, and later minister of finance, of agriculture, and communications. In 1979 Haskins retired from the cabinet and returned to family trading business.

From 1979 to 1989 he served as the Speaker of the National Assembly of Botswana.

References

1914 births
1990 deaths
Botswana businesspeople
Finance ministers of Botswana
Botswana Democratic Party politicians
Speakers of the National Assembly (Botswana)
White Botswana people
People from Bulawayo